Phillipp Steinhart (born 7 July 1992) is a German professional footballer who plays as a left back for 1860 Munich.

Club career

Youth career
Born in Dachau, Steinhart grew up in Gernlinden, a district of Maisach. He started playing football at the age of eight and his first club was local TSV Gernlinden. Subsequently, he spent a year at SC Fürstenfeldbruck, before joining local heavyweights 1860 Munich in 2004.

1860 Munich and Bayern Munich
Steinhart made an appearance for 1860 Munich during the 2011–12 season. However, most of his playing time at 1860 Munich was with the reserve team. He made 30 appearances for the reserve team in the 2011–12 Regionalliga season, 36 appearances in the 2012–13 season, and 30 appearances in the 2013–14 season.

Then Steinhart transferred to Bayern Munich II. During the 2014–15 season, Steinhart scored two goals in 29 appearances. During the 2015–16 season, Steinhart scored a goal in 27 appearances.

Sportfreunde Lotte
Steinhart transferred to Sportfreunde Lotte. He finished the 2016–17 season with three German Cup appearances.

Return to 1860 Munich
Steinhart returned to 1860 Munich and made his return on matchday seven against FV Illertissen. During the 2018–19 season, Steinhart scored five goals in 36 3. Liga appearances and one German Cup appearance.

International career
Steinhart also earned three caps for Germany national youth teams.

Career statistics

References

External links

1992 births
Living people
German footballers
Association football fullbacks
Regionalliga players
2. Bundesliga players
3. Liga players
TSV 1860 Munich players
TSV 1860 Munich II players
FC Bayern Munich II players
FC Bayern Munich footballers
Sportfreunde Lotte players